Ganta Srinivasarao (born 1 Dec 1956) is an Indian politician. He was the minister of Human Resources Development of Andhra Pradesh in India.

He is representing the Telugu Desam Party (TDP) in the Andhra Pradesh Legislative Assembly from Visakhapatnam North (Assembly constituency).
He was elected as MLA from Chodavaram in 2004 on Telugu Desam Party party ticket, Anakapalle in 2009 on Praja Rajyam Party ticket, Bhimili Assembly Constituency in 2014 on Telugu Desam Party party ticket. He was also elected as MP from Anakapalli Lok Sabha constituency in 1999.

He started his political journey with Telugu Desam Party and joined Praja Rajyam Party. He is a close associate of Chiranjeevi. He also worked as Minister in N. Kiran Kumar Reddy cabinet after Praja Rajyam Party merged into Indian National Congress.

References

India MPs 1999–2004
1960 births
Living people
Lok Sabha members from Andhra Pradesh
Andhra Pradesh MLAs 2014–2019
People from Prakasam district
State cabinet ministers of Andhra Pradesh
Telugu Desam Party politicians
Praja Rajyam Party politicians
Andhra Pradesh politicians
Andhra Pradesh MLAs 2019–2024